Iolaus sciophilus, the dark jewel sapphire, is a butterfly in the family Lycaenidae. It is found in Nigeria (Cross River loop) and western Cameroon. The habitat consists of forests.

The larvae feed on Globimetula braunii.

References

External links

Die Gross-Schmetterlinge der Erde 13: Die Afrikanischen Tagfalter. Plate XIII 68 e

Butterflies described in 1916
Iolaus (butterfly)
Butterflies of Africa